Limestone is an unincorporated community and census-designated place in Hardee County, Florida, United States. Its population was 157 as of the 2020 census.

Geography
Limestone is in southwestern Hardee County and is bordered to the south by Desoto County.

Demographics

References

Unincorporated communities in Hardee County, Florida
Unincorporated communities in Florida
Census-designated places in Hardee County, Florida
Census-designated places in Florida